OEH or Oeh may refer to:
 2-oxopent-4-enoate hydratase, an enzyme
 Office of Environment & Heritage, a government department in New South Wales, Australia
 Old Engineering Hall, an academic building on the University of Pittsburgh campus
 Oswego East High School, a public high school in Oswego, Illinois
 Daniel Oeh, the original author of AntennaPod

See also
 O. E. H. Wucherer (1820-1873), a Brazilian physician